Njål Vindenes (born 17 July 1957 in Vinnes, Norway) is a Norwegian classical musician (guitar and lute) residing in Bergen, Norway.

Biography 
Vindenes started his formal musical education on the music program at U. Pihls high school in Bergen, with guitar as the main instrument (1973–76). There after he studied guitar first with a Bachelor's degree at the Bergen Musikckonsevatorium (1976–1980), and later earning a Master's degree at the Norwegian Academy of Music (1980–1983).

Musician and cider enthusiast Vindenes have invested much time and money in developing a fruity Norwegian apple cider. Now five thousand bottles are put up for sale at Vinmonopolet.

Vindenes is Professor at the Bergen University College and assistant professor at the Grieg Academy.

Discography

Solo albums 
 1993: Sequenza (Victoria)
 1995: Touching Strings (AAP)
 2012: Guitar Music by Barrios and Villa-Lobos (Euridice)
 2016: Opus 15, Sonatas and Variations for Guitar by Mauro Giuliani and Fernando Sor (On It)

Collaborations 
 With Lars-Erik ter Jung
 1993: Dan Fagraste Viso Pao Joræ (The Loveliest Song on Earth) (AAP), music by Geirr Tveitt

 With Hilde Haraldsen Sveen
 2015: Sangen der skyggen skar EP

References

Bibliography 
 2008: Notar i Praksis : Fernando Sor: Op.35, No. 4, Universitetsforlaget

External links 
 Barokkopera på Vestlandske Kunstindustrimuseum at NBallade.no 
 Fernando Sor - 24 studies, op. 35 - No. 4 in G Major at YouTube

20th-century Norwegian guitarists
21st-century Norwegian guitarists
Norwegian classical guitarists
Norwegian male guitarists
Musicians from Bergen
Norwegian Academy of Music alumni
Academic staff of the University of Bergen
Norwegian classical musicians
1957 births
Living people
20th-century guitarists
20th-century Norwegian male musicians
21st-century Norwegian male musicians
Male jazz musicians